Salbiz (also Romanized as Salbīz) is a village in Mahur Rural District, Mahvarmilani District, Mamasani County, Fars Province, Iran. At the 2006 census, its population was 6, in 4 families.

References 

Populated places in Mamasani County